Josh Keller (born February 16, 1975 in Laguna Niguel, California) is a retired American soccer midfielder who spent four seasons in Major League Soccer.

Keller attended UCLA, playing on the men’s soccer team from 1994 to 1997.  In 1997, he was captain of the team when it won the NCAA Men's Soccer Championship.  He graduated cum laude with a bachelor's degree in psychology and business.  In March 1998, the Tampa Bay Mutiny selected Keller in the first round (seventh overall) in the 1998 MLS College Draft.  He played nine games for the Mutiny in 1998 before being traded to the Chicago Fire on June 29, 1998 in exchange for Jorge Salcedo.  He played six games for the Fire that season.   He also went on loan with the Charleston Battery of the USL A-League for four games.  On March 17, 1999, the Fire traded Keller back to the Mutiny.  When the Mutiny folded in 2001, the Dallas Burn selected Keller in the first round of the 2002 MLS Dispersal Draft.  He elected to retire from professional soccer and joined Morgan Stanley, a financial services company.  He later moved to Booz Allen Hamilton, a consulting firm.  In  January 2005, Keller moved to Proactive Sports Management where he is currently the Director of Marketing.

References

1975 births
Living people
American soccer players
Charleston Battery players
Tampa Bay Mutiny players
Chicago Fire FC players
UCLA Bruins men's soccer players
Major League Soccer players
MLS Pro-40 players
A-League (1995–2004) players
Tampa Bay Mutiny draft picks
People from Laguna Niguel, California
Soccer players from California
Association football midfielders